Kite (also called A Kite) is a 2014 South African action film directed by Ralph Ziman, based on the 1998 anime of the same name by Yasuomi Umetsu. The film stars India Eisley, Callan McAuliffe and Samuel L. Jackson.

Synopsis
Society has degenerated into a slum where people have taken to kidnapping children and selling them to flesh cartels. A young woman named Sawa (India Eisley) has been pretending to be a prostitute in order to kill some of the cartel leaders, ultimately trying to reach the main leader, Emir, who had killed her parents. After a kill, she finds she needs to relax by taking a drug called "Amp", which also wipes her memories.

Cast
 India Eisley as Sawa
 Callan McAuliffe as Oburi
 Samuel L. Jackson as Karl Aker
 Carl Beukes as Vic Thornhill
 Deon Lotz as Detective Prinsloo

Production

Pre-production
A live action adaptation of Kite was reported to be in various stages of pre-production for a number of years, with American film director Rob Cohen attached as either director or producer. The film, which takes place in a post-financial collapse corrupt society, follows a girl who tries to track down her father's killer with help from his ex-partner. The content of the live action film is expected to be toned down from the original OVA. On 2 September 2011, David R. Ellis was hired to direct the remake. On 17 December 2012, Samuel L. Jackson announced that he was the first actor to join the cast of Ellis's Kite, with filming taking place in Johannesburg. Ellis died on 7 January 2013, before shooting started. On 3 February 2013, Ralph Ziman took over as director of the film; actors India Eisley and Callan McAuliffe subsequently joined the cast.

Filming
Filming wrapped in February 2013 in Johannesburg, South Africa.

Marketing
The 10-minute trailer for the film was released on 6 January 2014, followed by another trailer on 16 July.

Release
On 10 May 2013, The Weinstein Company acquired worldwide distribution rights for Kite outside of the US, South Africa, and India. On 17 April 2014, Anchor Bay Entertainment acquired the US and Canada distribution rights to the film.

The film was released in 2014. It is the first film based on the anime film licensed in the US by Anime Works.

Critical reception
Rotten Tomatoes reported that 0% of critics have given the film a positive review based on 15 reviews, with an average rating of 2.66/10. It also has a Metacritic score of 19 out of 100 based on 7 reviews, indicating "overwhelming dislike".

John DeFore of The Hollywood Reporter wrote on his review that "Ralph Ziman's Kite repackages an assortment of genre tropes into an instantly forgettable Luc Besson-aping slog that would be unneeded even if Besson hadn't just returned to big action flicks himself." Peter Debruge of Variety commented: "The super-controversial, often-censored story of an orphaned schoolgirl turned sex slave and assassin isn’t for everyone (and you can’t entirely blame those countries whose strict anti-child pornography laws deemed it wasn’t for anyone), although a slicker, less overtly kinky remake should have been catnip to Sin City and Sucker Punch fans. But judging by the disappointing results, this uninspired Anchor Bay release awaits homevid obscurity." Peter Howell of the Toronto Star gave the film two out of four stars, commenting that "Ziman creates a visually interesting, graffiti-festooned landscape, there's a plenitude of action – including some truly goring death scenes – and Eisley and Callan McAuliffe as Oburi are both nicely appealing. But the tedium soon sets in, thanks mostly to a story that feels clichéd beyond bearing, including a final twist that is so 'never mind.'"

References

External links
 
 
 

2014 films
2014 action films
Dystopian films
2010s English-language films
English-language South African films
Films about human trafficking
Films about orphans
Films about revenge
Films shot in Gauteng
Girls with guns films
Gun fu films
Live-action films based on animated series
Remakes of Japanese films
South African action films